The San Diego Conquistadors (known as the San Diego Sails in their final, partial season), were an American Basketball Association (ABA) team based in San Diego. The "Q's", as they were popularly known, played from 1972 to 1975. As the Sails, they played an incomplete season only, beginning the 1975–1976 season but folding after only 11 games with 3 wins and 8 losses.

History

San Diego Conquistadors
The franchise was founded by Leonard Bloom in 1972 as the ABA's first—and as it turned out, only—expansion team. The team was slated to play at the San Diego Sports Arena, but a feud between Bloom and Peter Graham, operator and lease-holder of the city-owned 14,400 seat arena, led Graham to lock the newborn team out of the facility for two years. Graham was reportedly upset about Bloom being awarded the ABA expansion team he had also sought. By the time the conflict was resolved in the fall of 1974, it was too late for a weakened franchise that had been forced to play, in the interim, at bandboxed Peterson Gymnasium (3,200 seats) on the campus of San Diego State University, and Golden Hall, a multipurpose facility in Downtown.

After reaching the 1973 ABA Playoffs in their inaugural season, the Q's seemingly pulled off a coup by paying center Wilt Chamberlain $600,000 to become their player-coach. But the Los Angeles Lakers sued to block their former star from playing for his new team. Relegated to a sideline role, Chamberlain was reduced to an indifferent, 7-foot-1-inch sideshow who once skipped a game in favor of an autograph session for his recently published autobiography. (His fill-in, on that and other occasions, was Stan Albeck, who later skippered the Chicago Bulls, San Antonio Spurs and New Jersey Nets of the NBA.) Nonetheless, the team again reached the postseason, bowing out in the first round, for the second year in a row, in the 1974 ABA Playoffs.

The season, however, was overshadowed by the arena situation.  Frustrated with his inability to get a lease for the Sports Arena, Bloom announced plans for a 20,000-seat arena in Chula Vista.  However, a referendum on the arena, held just after the season started, failed by only 294 votes.  League officials then ordered Bloom to take preliminary steps toward moving to Los Angeles, in hopes of returning to a market abandoned by the Utah Stars four years earlier.

For their third season in 1974–75, the Conquistadors lost Chamberlain and finally gained a lease in the Sports Arena. But without Chamberlain as a gate attraction, the team was roundly ignored by San Diegans, and placed last in the Western Division, missing the 1975 ABA Playoffs.

San Diego Sails 
Bloom sold the franchise during the summer of 1975 to Frank Goldberg, a former co-owner of the successful Denver Nuggets franchise. Goldberg started anew, renaming the team the San Diego Sails and hiring former University of Minnesota coach Bill Musselman. With a completely different roster, color scheme, set of uniforms and just about everything else, the re-branded Sails sought to repeat Denver's turnaround a season earlier from mediocrity to championship contender.

But the Sails attracted just 3,060 fans to their home opener on October 24, 1975 – a loss to the Nuggets – and fan attendance rapidly dwindled further as the team limped to a 3-8 start; only 1,670 showed up for San Diego's third (and ultimately last) home game, against the San Antonio Spurs. Goldberg soon learned San Diego was to be shut out of the pending ABA–NBA merger, reportedly due to the insistence of Lakers owner Jack Kent Cooke, who refused to share his Southern California fan base with a team to the south.

With the team lacking fan support or a long-term future, Goldberg folded the franchise on November 12. The ABA, which planned to start the season with ten teams only to have the Baltimore Claws fold after three exhibition games, saw its number drop to eight with the Sails' failure; on December 2, the Utah Stars also disbanded, cutting the league to seven teams and forcing the ABA to shrink its two-division setup to just one.

The ABA's demise and later San Diego basketball 
The moribund state of the last-place Virginia Squires, who folded after the season, left the ABA with only six teams and forced the league to seek a merger with the more established NBA, which absorbed four of the six remaining teams. (The Indiana Pacers, New York Nets, Denver Nuggets and San Antonio Spurs joined the NBA, while the owners of the Spirits of St. Louis and Kentucky Colonels were paid off and folded their franchises.)

In 1978, the NBA's Buffalo Braves arrived in San Diego as the San Diego Clippers; in 1984, they moved up the coast to become the Los Angeles Clippers. San Diego has not had another major-league pro basketball team since. A couple of minor-league hoops teams have called the city home: the CBA's San Diego Wildcards, who folded after only 21 games in 1996, and the International Basketball League's San Diego Stingrays, who played from 1999 to 2001. (San Diego has also had various franchises in the semi-pro, 21st century American Basketball Association, such as the B-Kings, Sol, Surf, Wildcats and Wildfire.)

Basketball Hall of Famers

Notes:
 1 Inducted as a player.

Season-by-season

|-
|colspan="6" align=center style="background:#FFD700; color:#C80815;"| San Diego Conquistadors
|-
|1972–73 || 30 ||54 ||.357 || Lost Division Semifinals || Utah 4, San Diego 0
|-
|1973–74 || 37 || 47 ||.440 || Lost Division Semifinals || Utah 4, San Diego 2
|-
|1974–75 || 31 || 53 ||.369|| colspan=2|Did not qualify 
|-
|colspan="6" align=center style="background:#FFFFFF; color:#000f89; border:2px solid #228B22;"| San Diego Sails
|-
|1975–76 || 3 ||8 ||.273|| Did not qualify|| (team folded)
|-

References

External links

 San Diego Sails page at RememberTheABA.com

 
American Basketball Association teams
Defunct basketball teams in the United States
Defunct basketball teams in California
1972 establishments in California
1975 disestablishments in California
Basketball teams established in 1972
Basketball teams disestablished in 1975